Vice Admiral Sir Geoffrey Thomas James Oliver Dalton  (14 April 1931 – 26 September 2020) was a Royal Navy officer who became Deputy Supreme Allied Commander Atlantic.

Naval career
Educated at Reigate Grammar School and the Royal Naval College, Dartmouth, Dalton joined the Royal Navy in 1949. He was given command of the frigate  in 1969. He was appointed Commanding Officer of the frigate  as well as Captain of the 7th Frigate Squadron in 1977, Commander of the School of Maritime Operations in 1979 and Assistant Chief of the Naval Staff (Policy) in 1981. He went on to be Deputy Supreme Allied Commander Atlantic in 1984 and retired in 1987.

In retirement he became Secretary General of MENCAP and, more recently, President of the D-Day and Normandy Fellowship.

He died on 26 September 2020 at the age of 89.

Family
In 1957 he married Jane Hamilton Baynes; they have four sons.

References

1931 births
2020 deaths
People educated at Reigate Grammar School
Royal Navy vice admirals
Knights Commander of the Order of the Bath